Paul Carrington (March 16, 1733 – June 23, 1818) was a Virginia planter, lawyer, judge and politician. He served in the House of Burgesses before being elected a justice of the Virginia Court of Appeals (now the Supreme Court of Virginia). He was a delegate to the Virginia Ratifying Convention in 1788, and cast his vote for ratification of the United States Constitution.

Early life and education
Carrington was born on March 16, 1733, at "Boston Hill" in what was then Goochland County of the Colony of Virginia, later Cumberland County. His parents were Col. George Carrington (1711–1785) and his kinswoman Johanna Mayo (1712–1785). His paternal grandparents, Dr. Paul Carrington and Henningham Codrington, had migrated from England to the Island of Barbados. His father immigrated to the Colony of Virginia in 1723. A family tradition claims that the father accompanied William Mayo on the 1728 expedition to survey the boundary between Virginia and North Carolina. If accurate, Col. Carrington, William Mayo and William Cabell (1700-1774) were three of the largest landowners in southern Virginia. Col. Carrington did patent land that became Albemarle, Buckingham, Cumberland and Goochland Counties. Paul Carrington's maternal grandparents were Major William Mayo and Frances Gould.

After a private education, at about age 17 Carrington began to study (read) law under the direction of Colonel Clement Read in Lunenburg County.

On October 1 of that year he married Margaret Read, Col. Read's second daughter, and they resided at Mulberry Hill. Their children included George Carrington (1756–1809), Mary Scott Carrington Venable (1758–1837), Ann Carrington Cabell (1760–1838), Clement Carrington (1762–1847) and Paul Carrington (1764–1816). His wife died May 1, 1766; Carrington referred to her as "the best of wives and a woman of innumerable virtues."

Career

In May 1755, Carrinton received a license to practice law in Virginia, signed by Peyton Randolph, John Randolph and George Wythe. In 1756, he accepted an appointment as king's attorney (prosecutor) for Bedford County. As he gained legal and political experience, and colonial settlement moved westward, he accepted additional appointments as king's attorney—for Mecklenburg County in 1767, of Botetourt County in 1770, and of Lunenburg County in 1770.

Carrington also became an officer of the Lunenburg County militia, with the rank of major in 1761. In 1764, he became colonel of the Charlotte County militia in 1764. He also served for years a vestryman and churchwarden of Cornwall Parish.

After practicing law in various southern Virginia counties, Carrington was elected as a representative to the House of Burgesses for Charlotte County, which had been formed from then-vast Lunenburg County. He served in that position from 1765 until 1775. He was additionally made county lieutenant and presiding justice of Charlotte in 1772 and clerk of Halifax County that year. He was chairman of the Charlotte County Committee from 1774 to 1776, which endorsed the resolutions of the Continental Congress, and in 1775 became a member of the first Board of Trustees in the founding of Hampden-Sydney College.

Legislators elected Carrington as a Judge of the first Virginia General Court under the newly adopted Virginia state constitution on January 23, 1778. He was the second Justice appointed to the new Court of Appeals, which was then composed of judges from the General, the Admiralty and the Chancery Courts. In 1780 he became the chief justice of the Virginia General Court. In 1789, he was elected by the Virginia General Assembly to be a justice of the reorganized Virginia Supreme Court of Appeals.

In 1788, Carrington was a delegate to the Virginia Ratifying Convention, which narrowly ratified the United States Constitution, by a vote of  89 – 79. Although he voted in favor of ratification, he also played a vigorous role in the development of the Virginia Declaration of Rights, which was a model for the U.S. Bill of Rights.

On March 6, 1792, Carrington married his second wife, Priscilla Sims, aged 16. Their children were: Henry Carrington (1793–1867), Lettice Priscilla Carrington Coles (1798–1875), and Robert Carrington (1802–1845). She died in September 1803 and he recorded that her loss was irreparable to him and to her family.

Retirement and death

At age 75, concerned as to his ability to continue judicial duties, Carrington resigned from the bench in 1807. On August 1 of that year he wrote, "I have served the public a great many years, and I know with faithful integrity, I had arrived to a time of life that every man ought, in my opinion, to retire, and not remain and die at his post as some of my brethren have." Judge Carrington lived in retirement another 11 years until he died at the age of 85.

Judge Carrington is buried between his wives on the grounds at Mulberry Hill near Randolph, Virginia; his home was listed on the National Register of Historic Places in 1973. His papers, with those of his sons Clement and Robert Carrington, are held by the Library of Virginia. They include powers of attorney, judicial records, receipts, tax records, and deeds for the purchase of land and slaves.

References

House of Burgesses members
Justices of the Supreme Court of Virginia
Virginia lawyers
1733 births
1818 deaths
People from Charlotte County, Virginia
Delegates to the Virginia Ratifying Convention
18th-century American politicians
People from Cumberland County, Virginia
U.S. state supreme court judges admitted to the practice of law by reading law
18th-century American judges
19th-century American judges